This is a list of people who held the office of mayor of the Metropolitan Borough of Paddington. The office was created in 1900 and abolished in 1965.

List of mayors of Paddington from 1900-1965

1900s
 1900-1901 John Aird MP. Created a baronet, March 1901. 
 1901-1902 Sir John Aird MP (second term) 
 1902-1903 Henry Andrade Harben
 1903-1904 John Williams 
 1904-1905 William Urquhart 
 1905-1906 Herbert Lidiard 
 1906-1907 Herbert Lidiard (second term) 
 1907-1908 Lieutenant-General John Wimburn Laurie 
 1908-1909 Herbert Henry Fuller 
 1909-1910 Herbert Henry Fuller (second term)

1910s
 1910-1911 Herbert Lidiard (third term) 
 1911-1912 William George Perring 
 1912-1913 Harry George Handover 
 1913-1914 Harry George Handover (second term) 
 1914-1915 Harry George Handover (third term) 
 1915-1916 Harry George Handover (fourth term) 
 1916-1917 Harry George Handover (fifth term) 
 1917-1918 Harry George Handover (sixth term) 
 1918-1919 Harry George Handover (seventh term) 
 1919-1920 Harry George Handover (eighth term)

1920s
 1920-1921 Harold Vaughan Kenyon 
 1921-1922 Harold Vaughan Kenyon (second term) 
 1922-1923 Harold Vaughan Kenyon (third term) 
 1923-1924 Harold Vaughan Kenyon (fourth term) 
 1924-1925 Colin Stanley Crosse 
 1925-1926 Leonard Thomas Snell 
 1926-1927 Leonard Thomas Snell (second term) 
 1927-1928 Alfred Instone 
 1928-1929 Leonard Thomas Snell (third term) 
 1929-1930 Leonard Thomas Snell (fourth term)

1930s
 1930-1931 Leonard Thomas Snell (fifth term) 
 1931-1932 Sir Harry George Handover (ninth term) 
 1932-1933 Sir Harry George Handover (tenth term) 
 1933-1934 Sir Harry George Handover (eleventh term) 
 1934-1935 Sir Harry George Handover (twelfth term) 
 1935-1936 Harold Vaughan Kenyon (fifth term) 
 1936-1937 Harold Vaughan Kenyon (sixth term). Knighted 1937. 
 1937-1938 John Burgess Preston Karslake 
 1938-1939 Henry Halford Dawes 
 1939-1940 Henry Halford Dawes (second term) (died 17 February 1940)

1940s
 1940 (February–November) John Burgess Preston Karslake (second term) 
 1940-1941 Frank Stanley Henwood 
 1941-1942 Frank Stanley Henwood (second term) 
 1942-1943 Arthur Henry Barrett 
 1943-1944 Arthur Henry Barrett (second term) 
 1944-1945 Frederick Lawrence 
 1945-1946 Henry Berkwood Hobsbaum 
 1946-1947 Edward Avery 
 1947-1949 James Eugene MacColl 
 1949-1950 Arthur Henry Barrett (third term)

1950s
 1950-1951 Norris Kenyon 
 1951-1952 Norris Kenyon (second term) 
 1952-1953 (William) Ernest Harriss
 1953-1954 Col Walter Parkes. Chairman of the Board of Governors of St Mary's Hospital 1920-49. 
 1954-1955 Stanley Howard Crosse 
 1955-1956 Catherine Priscilla Rabagliati 3 January 1885–1973 
 1956-1957 Catherine Rabagliati (second term) 
 1957-1958 Major James Collins  
 1958-1959 Alexander Norman Carruthers born 1901 
 1959-1960 Raymond Robert Brown 20 August 1895–1973

1960s
 1960-1961 Arthur C Barrett 
 1961-1962 Patrick Barry 
 1962-1963 Denis McNair 
 1963-1964 Major James Collins (second term) 
 1964-1965 Jack Gillett (later Lord Mayor of Westminster 1976-77)

References

Paddington